Hufnagel  (literally "hoof nail", metonymic occupational name for a farrier) is a surname. Notable people with the surname include:

Charles A. Hufnagel, American surgeon
Johann Siegfried Hufnagel, German parson
John Hufnagel, Canadian football player, coach, and executive
Kevin Hufnagel, American musician
Klaus Hufnagel (born 1955), East German track and field athlete
Leon Hufnagel (1893–1933), Polish astrophysicist
Tibor Hufnágel (born 1991), Hungarian sprint canoeist
Yanni Hufnagel, American college basketball coach

See also
Hufnagle
German-language surnames

Occupational surnames